Piledriver (Brian Philip Calusky) is a fictional character, a supervillain appearing in American comic books published by Marvel Comics. He is a member of the Wrecker's Wrecking Crew.

The character made his live-action debut in the Marvel Cinematic Universe television series She-Hulk: Attorney at Law.

Publication history

Piledriver was created by Len Wein and Sal Buscema, and he made his first appearance in The Defenders #17 (November 1974).

Fictional character biography
Brian Philip Calusky was raised on a farm and eventually became a farmhand. As life on the farm is boring, he decides to commit crimes for excitement, which eventually land him in prison, where he meets and becomes cellmates with Dirk Garthwaite, also known as the Wrecker.

Garthwaite, together with Calusky, two other inmates at Ryker's Island Prison, Dr. Eliot Franklin, and Henry Camp, successfully breaks out of jail and finds his crowbar. When lightning strikes the crowbar, Garthwaite magically distributes the enhanced strength of the Wrecker among the four of them. The Wrecker's three allies then adopt costumes and aliases as well: Franklin becomes Thunderball, Camp becomes Bulldozer, and Calusky becomes Piledriver. As a result of his newfound powers, Calusky's hands become oversized in proportion to his body. Together, they become known as the Wrecking Crew. They battle the Defenders while attempting to locate the gamma bomb, and Piledriver is defeated by Power Man in this encounter.

With the Wrecking Crew, Piledriver fights Captain America and Iron Fist while trying to lure Thor into battle, who they later fight in a revenge attempt. They are among the various criminals taken to the Beyonder's Battleworld. Piledriver faces off against the Avengers, the Hulk, the X-Men, the Fantastic Four, and other superheroes. Piledriver steals computer discs from Dextron Labs and battles Spider-Man and Spider-Woman II. Along with the Wrecking Crew, Piledriver joins the Masters of Evil, which attacks and takes over Avengers Mansion. Piledriver helps defeat the god Hercules in combat but is drained of his superhuman powers by Thor. He is freed from prison by the Wrecker, but without his superhuman powers he is defeated by Spider-Man and Spider-Woman. He later regains his powers and escapes from the Vault.

Piledriver defeats Captain America and encounters Damage Control personnel. With the rest of the Wrecking Crew, Piledriver frees the Wrecker and Ulik from police custody and battles Hercules and Thor. His powers are drained by Loki, but he escapes.

Piledriver has the demeanor of a "good ol' country boy". He has fought many of Marvel's superheroes over the years, including Spider-Man, the Avengers, the Defenders, and Thor. As part of the Wrecking Crew, he threatens the lives of the innocent Damage Control workers. Thunderball, who has a soft spot for the man in charge, John Porter, attacks Piledriver and the others via trickery, allowing them to escape.

Unlike Thunderball, Piledriver has remained loyal to the Wrecker and has only been separated from the Wrecking Crew through many incarcerations.

Piledriver discovers that he has a son named Ricky Calusky. The boy lives with his grandparents, but when he discovers who his father is, he runs away and joined the Wrecking Crew as the Excavator, gaining a mystically charged shovel. However, he and the rest of the Crew were defeated by the Runaways during a bank robbery.

The Hood has hired Piledriver as part of his criminal organization to take advantage of the split in the superhero community caused by the Superhuman Registration Act. He helps them fight the New Avengers but is taken down by Dr. Strange.

As part of the Hood's gang, he later joins the fight against the invading Skrull force in New York. He joins the Hood's gang in an attack on the New Avengers, who were expecting the Dark Avengers instead.

During the Avengers: Standoff! storyline, Piledriver is an inmate of Pleasant Hill, a gated community established by S.H.I.E.L.D.

During the "Search for Tony Stark" story arc, Piledriver and the Wrecking Crew rejoin the Hood's gang as they attack Castle Doom. Piledriver is defeated by Doctor Doom in his Iron Man armor.

Powers and abilities
Due to Asgardian magic, Piledriver possesses superhuman strength and a high degree of imperviousness to harm. He can withstand high amounts of concussive force and is virtually bulletproof. Piledriver's power augments his entire body, strengthening his bone, muscle, and flesh. Because of this, he can withstand the impact of high-caliber bullets. Because of his strength and particular talent, he has oversized hands which are more powerful than the other members of the Wrecking Crew, except for the Wrecker. His superhuman abilities are four times greater than when he originally took some of the Wrecker's power, making him somewhat stronger than an average well-trained Asgardian god.

Other versions

House of M: Masters of Evil
Piledriver and the rest of the Wrecking Crew appear as members of the Hood's Masters of Evil. He ends up being absorbed into Scramble's body when the Masters of Evil arrive in the Central American country of Santo Rico.

Ultimate Marvel
In the Ultimate Marvel Universe, Piledriver, as a regular civilian, works for Damage Control. As in regular continuity, he and his friends gain superpowers and seize control of the Flatiron Building, take hostages, and demand a ransom. Power Princess defeats them in battle.

In other media

Television
 Piledriver appears in The Super Hero Squad Show episode "To Err is Superhuman!", voiced by Travis Willingham.
 Piledriver appears in The Avengers: Earth's Mightiest Heroes, voiced by Nolan North.
 Piledriver appears in the Ultimate Spider-Man episode "Damage", voiced by Cam Clarke.
 Piledriver appears in Avengers Assemble, voiced again by Cam Clarke.
 Piledriver appears in Hulk and the Agents of S.M.A.S.H., voiced by Jonathan Adams.
 Piledriver appears in Marvel Disk Wars: The Avengers.
 Piledriver appears in the She-Hulk: Attorney at Law episode "The People vs. Emil Blonsky", portrayed by an uncredited actor. This version wields a pair of Asgardian gloves.

Video games
 Piledriver appears as a collective boss alongside the Wrecking Crew in Marvel: Ultimate Alliance, voiced by Michael Gough.
 Piledriver appears as a boss in Marvel: Avengers Alliance.

References

External links
 Piledriver at Marvel.com

Characters created by Sal Buscema
Characters created by Len Wein
Comics characters introduced in 1974
Fictional characters from New York City
Marvel Comics characters who can move at superhuman speeds
Marvel Comics characters with superhuman strength
Marvel Comics mutates
Marvel Comics supervillains
Thor (Marvel Comics)

fr:Démolisseurs#Compresseur / Brian Philip Calusky